"Hanging Around" is the first single by Irish singer-songwriter Gemma Hayes, released in 2002 on the Source Records label. The single is taken from her debut album Night on My Side. The music video for the song made its debut outside Ireland on MTV France on 27 April 2002.

Track listing
All songs written by Gemma Hayes.

 "Hanging Around"
 "Stop the Wheel"
 "Parked"

Also includes video for "Hanging Around", directed by John Hillcoat.

Charts

References

2002 songs
Gemma Hayes songs
Song recordings produced by Dave Fridmann
Songs written by Gemma Hayes